Pniów  is a village in the administrative district of Gmina Radomyśl nad Sanem, within Stalowa Wola County, Subcarpathian Voivodeship, in south-eastern Poland. It was founded in the 14th century, presumably by Polish king Kazimierz the Great.

In 2006 the village had an approximate population of 330.

References

Villages in Stalowa Wola County